Ellen Owen (born May 4, 1963) is an American former diver. She competed in the women's 10 metre platform event at the 1992 Summer Olympics.

References

External links
 

1963 births
Living people
American female divers
Olympic divers of the United States
Divers at the 1992 Summer Olympics
Sportspeople from Louisville, Kentucky
21st-century American women